Maniltoa lenticellata is a flowering tropical tree in the family Fabaceae. It is native to tropical semi-deciduous rainforest and gallery forests in northern Queensland, some of the Torres Strait Islands, and New Guinea. Common names include: silk handkerchief tree, cascading bean, and native handkerchief tree.

It has compound leaves with 2-4 pairs of leaflets. New leaves are folded inside dull red bracts and then released in a spectacular cascade of white foliage. The fruity-scented flowers which appear in north Queensland in September to October have 3 to 5 white-cream petals, and may be pollinated by marsupials or bats. They produce a brown pod 25–70 mm long by 18-50mm containing one brown seed in November to March. It is a favoured garden tree.
"Maniltoa lenticellata var. villosa Verdc. from New Guinea differs from var. lenticellata in having ovaries with dense, persistent hairs." Quoted from:

Footnotes

References
Beasley, John. (2009). Plants of Cape York: The Compact Guide. John Beasley, Kuranda, Qld., Australia. .
Endress, Peter K. and Brigitta Steiner-Gafner. (1996). Diversity and Evolutionary Biology of Tropical Flowers. Cambridge University Press. ,

External links
General information. 
Images of flowering tree.

lenticellata
Fabales of Australia
Flora of Queensland
Trees of Australia
Flora of New Guinea
Ornamental trees